Pteruchus barrealensis is an unusually large species of Pteruchus with very elongate polleniferous heads from Early Triassic of Australia and Argentina.

Description 
Pteruchus barrealensis is one of the geologically earliest species of Pteruchus, and has very elongate polleniferous heads.

Whole plant reconstruction 
Pteruchus barrealensis from the Early Triassic of Australia may have been produced by the same plant as Umkomasia feistmantelii (ovulate organs) and Dicroidium zuberi (leaves)

References

Triassic plants
Pteridospermatophyta